The Vulture Peak (Pali:  गिज्झकूट, Sanskrit:  गृद्धकूट), also known as the Holy Eagle Peak or Gridhakūta (or Gādhrakūta), was the Buddha's favorite retreat in Rajagaha (now Rajgir, or Rajagrih). It was the scene for many of his discourses. Rajgir is located in Bihar, India. It is so named because it resembles a sitting vulture with its wings folded.

In Buddhist literature
Vulture Peak Mountain is, by tradition, one of several sites frequented by the Buddha and his community of disciples for both training and retreat. Its location is frequently mentioned in Buddhist texts in the Pāli Canon of Theravada Buddhism and in the Mahayana sutras as the place where the Buddha gave certain sermons. Among the sermons are the Heart Sutra, the Lotus Sutra and the Śūraṅgama Samādhi Sūtra as well as many prajnaparamita sutras. It is explicitly mentioned in the Lotus Sutra, chapter 16, as the Buddha's pure land:

Gallery

References

Notes

Bibliography

External links

 Vulture Peak on Dhamma Wiki
 elevation on buddhadhyana

Mountains of Bihar
Nalanda district
 Buddhist sites in Bihar